Jason Lollar is an American luthier, musician, and co-founder of Lollar Pickups. A 1979 graduate of the Roberto-Venn School of Luthiery, Jason is the author of Basic Pickup Winding and Complete Guide to Making Your Own Pickup Winder, now in its third edition, and a contributor to Bart Hopkin's Getting a Bigger Sound: Pickups and Microphones for Your Musical Instrument.

In addition to designing and producing archtop, solid-body electric, and lap steel guitars, Jason is a noted authority on electric pickups and builder of hand-wound electro-magnetic pickups.

History
In the early 1990s, Lollar was building archtop guitars with his custom-made P-90 pickups, which he had been making since 1979 in small quantities. The pickups soon became so popular that top musicians were asking for them. After publishing Basic Pickup Winding in 1995, he founded Lollar Pickups with his wife, Stephanie.

Lollar is an expert in the design and manufacturing of pickups a variety of pickups for guitar, bass, and steel. His company, Lollar Pickups, makes an assortment of pickups including Stratocaster, Telecaster, Humbucker, Fender Jazzmaster, Fender Precision bass, Fender Mustang, Fender Mustang bass, Humbucker, Charlie Christian style, gold foil, and other single coil pickups.

Publications
 Basic Pickup Winding and Complete Guide to Making Your Own Pickup Winder, book, 70-page edition includes a newly update preface. Originally published in 1995.
 Bart Hopkin's Getting a Bigger Sound: Pickups and Microphones for Your Musical Instrument.

References

External links 
 Jason Lollar Guitars Website
 Lollar Gold Foil Pickups Review
 Interview with Pickup Guru and Luthier Jason Lollar
 Lollar Pickups El Rayo Humbuckers Review
 Dave Hunter excerpt from ″The Guitar Pickups Handbook″

Year of birth missing (living people)
Living people
American luthiers
American male guitarists